Horace Henry Glasock VC (16 October 1880 – 20 October 1916) was an English recipient of the Victoria Cross (VC), the highest award for gallantry in the face of the enemy that may be awarded to British and Commonwealth forces.

Glasock was 19 years old, and a driver in 'Q' Battery, Royal Horse Artillery, British Army during the Second Boer War when the following deed took place for which he was awarded the VC:

Victoria Cross
On 31 March 1900 at Sanna's Post (aka Korn Spruit), South Africa, 'Q' and 'U' batteries of the Royal Horse Artillery were ambushed with the loss of most of the baggage column and five guns of the leading battery. When the alarm was given, 'Q' Battery went into action 1150 yards from the spruit, until the order to retire was received, when Major Phipps-Hornby (VC, CB, CMG), commanding officer of the battery, ordered the guns and their limbers to be run back by hand to a safe place.  This most exhausting operation was carried out by, among others, Driver Glasock, Sergeant Charles Parker (VC) and Gunner Isaac Lodge (VC).  When at last all but one of the guns and one limber had been moved to safety, the battery was reformed.

Citation
The citation reads:

Glasock was one of the gunners and drivers, elected as described above.

Lieutenant Francis Aylmer Maxwell also earned the Victoria Cross in this action.

Later life

Following his service in the Boer War, he remained in the Royal Horse Artillery until 1911, when he was discharged. He then emigrated to South Africa and settled in Johannesburg with his wife. On the outbreak of World War I, he served as a Conductor with Transports and Remounts in the South African Service Corps. Glasock died whilst in service at Cape Town on 20 October 1916, just four days after his 36th birthday. He was buried in Maitland Cemetery, Cape Town.

Notes

References
Monuments to Courage (David Harvey, 1999)
The Register of the Victoria Cross (This England, 1997)
Victoria Crosses of the Anglo-Boer War (Ian Uys, 2000)

External links
 Find-A-Grave profile for Horace Henry Glasock
Angloboerwar.com
 

1880 births
1916 deaths
Burials in South Africa
Military personnel from London
Second Boer War recipients of the Victoria Cross
British recipients of the Victoria Cross
Royal Horse Artillery soldiers
British Army personnel of the Second Boer War
People from Islington (district)
South African Army personnel
English emigrants to South Africa
South African military personnel of World War I
British Army recipients of the Victoria Cross
South African military personnel killed in World War I